Puerto Rico Highway 647 (PR-647) is a north–south road located between the municipalities of Corozal and Vega Alta, Puerto Rico. It extends from its junction with PR-159 and PR-5568 on the Cibuco–Padilla line in western Corozal, passing through Cienegueta, Candelaria and Bajura barrios until its end at PR-676 in downtown Vega Alta.

Major intersections

See also

 List of highways numbered 647

References

External links
 

647